Gerhard Bast (January 12, 1911 – March 9, 1947) was an Austrian lawyer, Sturmbannführer in the Gestapo, and a leader of the task force of the Einsatzgruppen.

Life

Gerhard Bast, son of attorney Rudolf Bast, grew up in a German national household. In 1912, the family moved to Amstetten. Bast studied at the high school in Wels. After graduation he studied jurisprudence at the University of Graz, where he was a member of the burschenschaft (student fraternity) "Germania Graz". He graduated law school in 1935 with his doctorate. In October 1931, he became a member of the NSDAP (member number 612,972) and shortly thereafter joined the SS (SS Number 23,064). After graduation, Bast worked at the county court in St. Pölten, but lost his job shortly afterwards due to his membership in the Nazi Party. Bast then worked in his father's law office, who was an enthusiastic national socialist.

After the German Reich's Anschluss with Austria, on March 20, 1938, Bast joined the Sicherheitsdienst and Gestapo. Bast was first placed to work in Graz, where he in early 1940 became the head of the department for combat and investigation of enemies. In August 1940, Bast moved to the Gestapo in Koblenz; then from January 1941, he headed the state police control center in Linz on behalf of Humbert Achamer-Pifrader. In the SS he achieved the position of Sturmbannführer and was also promoted to the government council. Since July 1941, he was the leader of the Gestapo in Münster. In this position, he was heavily involved in the deportation of Jews out of Germany and took part in the executions of Polish forced laborers.

From November 1942 to December 1942 he was leader of the Sonderkommando 11a in Einsatzgruppe D and led the assassinations of Jews. In January 1943, Bast was transferred to Linz, where he led the Gestapo. In November 1943, Bast accidentally killed a young hunter while hunting. He was convicted of negligent manslaughter and sentenced to 4 months in prison. However, as he could "prove his worth" on the Eastern Front, Bast did not have to serve his sentence.

From June 1944 to October/November 1944, Bast was leader of the Sonderkommando 7a in the "Einsatzgruppe B". Later, he was deployed with his special unit in the "Einsatzgruppe H" under lead of "BdS Pressburg" to fight partisans.

Bast obtained the following awards: War Merit Cross I and II class with swords, Ostvolk Medal II class in silver, as well as an armed forces cross (Heeressiegeskreuz) III class with swords. He was referred to as Alter Kämpfer.

At the end of World War II he disappeared under a false name. As an alleged farmhand and lumberjack, he found accommodation and employment at a farm in South Tyrol. In March 1947, he wanted to return to his family in Innsbruck and asked the help of a smuggler to assist him in passing the guarded Brenner Pass. Before reaching the Brenner Pass, however, the smuggler robbed and killed Bast, shooting him three times. In 1949, a court in Bolzano convicted the smuggler of murder and robbery and sentenced him to 30 years in prison.

The Austrian author Martin Pollack is the illegitimate son of Gerhard Bast. Pollack wrote the book: "Der Tote im Bunker. Bericht über meinen Vater", that was published in Vienna in 2004.

Literature
 Helge Dvorak: Biographisches Lexikon der Deutschen Burschenschaft. Band I: Politiker. Teilband 7: Supplement A–K. Winter, Heidelberg 2013, S. 45–46.
 Ernst Klee: Das Personenlexikon zum Dritten Reich. Fischer, Frankfurt am Main 2007. . (Aktualisierte 2. Auflage)
 Martin Pollack: Der Tote im Bunker. Bericht über meinen Vater. Zsolnay, Wien 2004, .
 Gerald Steinacher: Nazis auf der Flucht. Wie Kriegsverbrecher über Italien nach Übersee entkamen, Frankfurt a. M. 2010, .  (Taschenbuchausgabe)

References

External links
 Record of interrogation of Bast's father in 1947 in the archives of the IFZ (PDF; 2,6 MB)
 Biography of Dr. Gerhard Bast

1911 births
1947 deaths
Austrian Nazis
Austrian people murdered abroad
Gestapo personnel
Einsatzgruppen personnel
Slovak people of World War II
Nazi Party members
20th-century Austrian lawyers
People murdered in Italy
Deaths by firearm in Italy
Holocaust perpetrators in Belarus
Holocaust perpetrators in Czechoslovakia
Holocaust perpetrators in Germany
Holocaust perpetrators in Lithuania
Holocaust perpetrators in Poland
Holocaust perpetrators in Ukraine
People convicted of manslaughter